The 2 krooni banknote (2 EEK) is a denomination of the Estonian kroon, the former currency of Estonia. Karl Ernst von Baer, who was an Estonian Baltic German anthropologist, naturalist and geographer (1792–1876), is featured with a portrait on the obverse. The 2 krooni bill is called sometimes a "kahene" meaning "a two". 
 
A view of Tartu University which was founded in 1632 is featured on the reverse. Before the replacement of the EEK by the euro, the 2 krooni banknote was the smallest denomination most commonly used by Estonian residents on an everyday basis. It can be exchanged indefinitely at the currency museum of Eesti Pank for €0.13.

History of the banknote
 1992: first series issued by the Bank of Estonia;
 2006: second series issued;
 2007: third series issued;
 2011: withdrawn from circulation and replaced by the euro

Security features 

Source: 
 1992
On the right-hand side of the banknote there is a watermark depicting the Tall Hermann Tower of Toompea Castle.
The paper of the banknotes contains security fibres of different colour.
Each note contains a security strip.
Each banknote has a seven-digit serial number printed in black.
 2006
 Portrait watermark.
 Dark security thread with transparent text "2 EEK EESTI PANK".
 Microprint, repeated text "EESTI PANK".
 Tactile intaglio-printed elements.
 Latent number "2".
 Signatures. Governor, Chairman of the Board.
 Anti-copier line-structure.
 UV-fluorescent fibres glowing green.
 UV-fluorescent security thread glowing blue.
 UV-fluorescent rectangle with the denomination "2".
 Serial numbers.

See also
 Currencies related to the euro
 Estonian euro coins
 Currency board
 Estonian mark
 Economy of Estonia

References

External links

 Global Financial Data data series - Estonia Kroon
 The Global History of Currencies - Estonia

Currencies of Estonia
Two-base-unit banknotes